is a private university in Fukuyama, Hiroshima, Japan, established in 1975.

Partner Universities
*Bulgaria
Sofia University
University of Veliko Turnovo

*China
University of International Business Economics
Capital Normal University
Guizhou Normal University
Sun Yat-sen University
Hunan University
Shanghai Normal University
Tianjin University of Science & Technology
Xi’an Peihua University
Chengdu Institute Sichuan International Studies University
Guangdong Polytechnic Normal University
Kaiki University
Yanbian University
Shanxi Normal University
Jiangxi Normal University
Hebei University

*Indonesia
Udayana University
Yogyakarta State University

*Mexico
University of Monterrey

*Poland
Vistula University
Nicolaus Copernicus University

*United States of America
University of California Riverside
California State University, San Marcos

*Vietnam
Vietnam National University of Agriculture
Vietnam National University Hochiminh City University of Social Sciences And Humanities
Foreign Trade University

External links
 Official website 
 English website  

Educational institutions established in 1975
Private universities and colleges in Japan
Universities and colleges in Hiroshima Prefecture